Kramers' law is a formula for the spectral distribution of X-rays produced by an electron hitting a solid target. The formula concerns only bremsstrahlung radiation, not the element specific characteristic radiation. It is named after its discoverer, the Dutch physicist Hendrik Anthony Kramers.

The formula for Kramers' law is usually given as the distribution of intensity (photon count)  against the wavelength  of the emitted radiation:

The intensity described above is a particle flux and not an energy flux as can be seen by the fact that the
However, the
integral of the energy flux is finite.

 (the angular frequency) using  and also using
.

The energy flux, which we will call  (but which may also be referred to as the "intensity" in conflict with the above name of ) is obtained by multiplying the above  by the energy :

for 

It is a linear function that is zero at the maximum energy .

References 

Spectroscopy
X-rays